Francophone Sud School District (French: District scolaire francophone Sud) is a Francophone Canadian school district in New Brunswick with its central offices in Dieppe. The district operates 37 schools in the south-central part of New Brunswick, including Albert, Westmorland, Saint John, Charlotte, Kings, Queens, Sunbury, York, and Northumberland counties.

More than 15,500 students attend Sud schools and 4,000 staff are employed.

History
New Brunswick School Districts 1 and 11 merged on June 30, 2012, to form Francophone Sud.

Primary schools

Secondary schools

See also
List of schools in New Brunswick
List of school districts in New Brunswick

References

External links
Official Website
Schools in Francophone Sud School District

French-language school districts in Canada
School districts in New Brunswick